Quilindschy Hartman (born 14 November 2001) is a Dutch professional footballer who plays as a left-back for Eredivisie club Feyenoord.

Club career
In June 2020, Hartman signed a contract at Feyenoord, where he was an academy player since moving from Excelsior in 2010. He made his debut for the club on 21 August 2022, starting away against RKC Waalwijk in a 1–0 win. On 8 September 2022, Hartman made his European debut, as a starter in a 4–2 away defeat to Lazio in the UEFA Europa League. Hartman scored his first goal for the club on November 10, 2022, scoring Feyenoord's first and only goal in a 1–0 win against SC Cambuur. Four days later, Feyenoord announced that the club and Hartman had reached an agreement for the player to extend his contract until 2025. On November 17, 2022, Hartman signed his new contract. Hartman received praise for his performance in De Klassieker in January 2023, with Wesley Sneijder calling Hartman the man of the match. On January 25, 2023, Hartman's squad number was changed from 19 to 5.

International career
In September 2022, Hartman was picked by Remko Bicentini for the squad of the Curaçao national team ahead of friendly games against Indonesia. However, Feyenoord didn't want to let Hartman go to his national team and Hartman was replaced by Bradley Martis in the squad.

Career statistics

References

2001 births
Living people
Association football fullbacks
Dutch footballers
Eredivisie players
Feyenoord players
Excelsior Rotterdam players
Dutch people of Curaçao descent